The Pittsburgh Journal of Environmental and Public Health Law was a law review edited by an independent student group at University of Pittsburgh School of Law, focusing on environmental law and public health. The journal was established in 2006 and was published annually by the University Library System (University of Pittsburgh) as part of its D-Scribe Digital Publishing program. Three issues were produced in 2011 and the journal became biannual after that. The last issue appeared in 2014. The journal is abstracted and indexed in HeinOnline.

References

External links

American law journals
Environmental law journals
Publications established in 2006
University of Pittsburgh student publications
Law journals edited by students
Academic journals published by university libraries
Defunct journals
Publications disestablished in 2014
English-language journals

Biannual journals
Creative Commons Attribution-licensed journals